Saint Blandina (c. 162–177 AD) was a Christian martyr who died in Lugdunum (modern Lyon, France) during the reign of Emperor Marcus Aurelius.

Context
In the first two centuries of the Christian era, it was the local Roman officials who were largely responsible for the persecution of Christians. In the second century, the emperors treated Christianity as a local problem to be dealt with by their subordinates. The number and severity of persecutions of Christians in various locations of the empire seemingly increased during the reign of Marcus Aurelius. The extent to which Marcus Aurelius himself directed, encouraged, or was aware of these persecutions is unclear and much debated by historians.

Traditional history
The traditional account regarding Blandina is reported by Eusebius in his Historia Ecclesiastica.
 
She belongs to the band of martyrs of Lyon who, after some of their number had endured frightful tortures, suffered martyrdom in 177 in the reign of Marcus Aurelius. Almost all we know of Blandina comes from a letter sent from the Church of Lyon to the Churches of Asia Minor. Eusebius gives significant space of her life and death in his book as he quotes from the aforementioned epistle to Asia Minor.  The fanaticism of the Roman populace in Lyon had been excited against the Christians so that the latter, when they ventured to show themselves publicly, were harassed and ill-treated.

While the imperial legate was away, the chiliarch, a military commander, and the duumvir, a civil magistrate, threw a number of Christians, who confessed their faith, into prison.  When the legate returned, the imprisoned believers were brought to trial.  Among these Christians was Blandina, a slave, who had been taken into custody along with her master, also a Christian.  Her companions greatly feared that on account of her bodily frailty she might not remain steadfast under torture.  But although the legate caused her to be tortured in a horrible manner, so that even the executioners became exhausted "as they did not know what more they could do to her", still she remained faithful and repeated to every question "I am a Christian, and we commit no wrongdoing."

 
Through fear of torture slaves had testified against their masters that the Christians when assembled committed cannibalism and incest, and the legate desired to wring confession of this misconduct from the Christian prisoners. In his report to the emperor the legate stated that those who held to their Christian belief were to be executed and those who denied their faith were to be released, and the legate received instructions from the Emperor Marcus Aurelius allowing the Roman citizens who persisted in the faith to be executed by beheading, but those without citizenship were to be tortured.  Blandina was therefore subjected to new tortures with a number of companions in the town's amphitheater (now known as the Amphitheatre of the Three Gauls) at the time of the public games.

She was bound to a stake and wild beasts were set on her.  According to legend, they did not, however, touch her.  After enduring this for a number of days, in an effort to persuade her to recant, she was led into the arena to see the sufferings of her companions.  Finally, as the last of the martyrs, she was scourged, placed on a red-hot grate, enclosed in a net and thrown before a wild steer who tossed her into the air with his horns. In the end, she was killed with a dagger.

Legacy

 Her feast is celebrated on June 2.
 Two communes in France are named after her. See Sainte-Blandine.

See also
Persecution in Lyon
Scillitan Martyrs
Acts of the Martyrs
List of Christian women of the patristic age

References

Further reading
Goodine, Elizabeth. 2014. Standing at Lyon: An examination of the Martyrdom of Blandina of Lyon. Piscataway, NJ: Gorgias Press.

External links

 Santa Blandina
Icons of St. Blandina, martyr All-Merciful Savior Orthodox Mission website
Catholic Encyclopedia: St. Blandina

177 deaths
2nd-century Roman women
Christian slaves and freedmen
People from Lugdunum
2nd-century Christian martyrs
Year of birth unknown
Ante-Nicene Christian female saints
Christian martyrs